El Hatillo is the seat of El Hatillo Municipality in Miranda, Venezuela.

Populated places in Miranda (state)